Hyena on the Keyboard was a South Korean variety show on KBS2. It is a music reality television show whereby the process of song production from various producers/singer-songwriters is shown. The completed songs will then be released as digital singles on various online music sites.

The show also has a side corner where rookie singer-songwriters are introduced; their self-produced songs will also be released on various online music sites.

Two pilot episodes were aired on October 7 and 8, 2017 while the four songs produced through the pilot episodes were released on October 9. The regular program began to air every Friday at 23:00 (KST) from March 2, 2018 until April 20, 2018.

Hosts
Jeong Hyeong-don (also hosted Pilot Episodes 1–2)
Jung Jae-hyung
Sleepy
Sunny (only hosted Pilot Episodes 1–2)

Episodes

Pilot

Regular

Discography

Pilot

Part 1

Part 2

Part 3

Part 4

Charted songs

Ratings 
In the ratings below, the highest rating for the show will be in red, and the lowest rating for the show will be in blue each year.

References

External links
  
 

2017 South Korean television series debuts
2018 South Korean television series endings
Korean-language television shows
Korean Broadcasting System original programming